Pre-math skills (referred to in British English as pre-maths skills) are math skills learned by preschoolers and kindergarten students, including learning to count numbers (usually from 1 to 10 but occasionally including 0), learning the proper sequencing of numbers, learning to determine which shapes are bigger or smaller, and learning to count objects on a screen or book. Pre-math skills are also tied into literacy skills to learn the correct pronunciations of numbers.

External links
 Pre-math Skills on Bella Online

Mathematics education
Parenting